Heaven Can Wait may refer to:

 Heaven Can Wait (1943 film), a comedy based on the stage play Birthday by Leslie Bush-Fekete
 Heaven Can Wait (1978 film), an American football comedy starring Warren Beatty; a remake of the 1941 film Here Comes Mr. Jordan
 "Heaven Can Wait", a 1938 stage play by Harry Segall; basis for 1941 film Here Comes Mr. Jordan

Music 
 Heaven Can Wait (Gamma Ray EP), 1990
 Heaven Can Wait (OPM EP), 2012
 Heaven Can Wait – The Best Ballads of Meat Loaf Vol. 1, a 1996 album
 "Heaven Can Wait" (Charlotte Gainsbourg song), 2010
 "Heaven Can Wait" (Michael Jackson song), 2001
 "Heaven Can Wait" (Sandra song), 1988
 "Heaven Can Wait", a song written by Jimmy Van Heusen and Eddie DeLange
 "Heaven Can Wait", a song by GPS
 "Heaven Can Wait", a song by Grave Digger from War Games
 "Heaven Can Wait", a song by Iron Maiden from Somewhere in Time
 "Heaven Can Wait", a song by LSD from LSD
 "Heaven Can Wait", a song by Meat Loaf from Bat Out of Hell
 "Heaven Can Wait", a song by We The Kings from Smile Kid

See also 
 Kevin Can Wait, an American sitcom television series